Jade Ashleigh Howard (born 3 April 1995) is a South African–Zambian swimmer. At the 2012 Summer Olympics, she competed in the Women's 100 metre freestyle, finishing in 39th place overall in the heats, failing to qualify for the semifinals. She graduated from Plymouth College.

References

External links

1995 births
Living people
Swimmers from Johannesburg
White South African people
White Zambian people
South African female freestyle swimmers
Olympic swimmers of Zambia
Swimmers at the 2012 Summer Olympics
Swimmers at the 2016 Summer Olympics
Commonwealth Games competitors for Zambia
Swimmers at the 2014 Commonwealth Games
Zambian female freestyle swimmers
People educated at Plymouth College